Gia is a 1998 film about Gia Marie Carangi.

GIA or Gia may also refer to:

People 
 Gia (name), a given name (including a list of people with the name)

Places
 Gia, Leh, a village in India
 Gan International Airport, Maldives
 Glasgow International Airport, Scotland, UK

Groups, companies, organizations
 GIA Publications, an American music publisher
 Gemological Institute of America
 Georgetown International Academy, in Guyana
 Georgia Interscholastic Association, formed 1948, merged to Georgia High School Association in 1970

Airlines
 Garuda Indonesian Airways, former name of Garuda Indonesia, the national airline of Indonesia
 Ghana International Airlines
 Gambia International Airlines

Government and political organizations 
 Armed Islamic Group of Algeria,
 Gallup International Association, a polling organization
 General Intelligence Agency of Mongolia
 Gia people, an Aboriginal Australian people of the state of Queensland.
 Government Information Awareness, an American open government project

Entertainment
 Gia (album), a 2001 album by Greek singer Despina Vandi
 "Gia" (song), a 2001 single by Despina Vandi, taken from the album

Other uses
 Gia (protein), a protein in Drosophila
 Glacial isostatic adjustment
 Gross internal area

See also

 
 
 Kea (island), in the Cyclades, Greece
 Kia (Korean: 기아, romanized: Gia), a Korean automobile company